Club car may refer to:

 Club Car, an American company that manufactures electric and gas-powered golf cars and utility vehicles
 Bar car, a train car that has as its primary purpose the provision and consumption of alcoholic and other beverages
 Lounge car, a train car where riders can purchase food and drinks
 Parlor car,  a type of rail passenger coach that provides superior comforts and amenities